Fatin Shidqia is an Indonesian singer and actress. This is a list of awards received by Fatin Shidqia.

Anugerah Musik Indonesia
The Anugerah Musik Indonesia (English translation: Indonesian Music Awards), is an annual Indonesian major music awards. They have been compared to the American Grammy Awards and British Brit Awards. The award was formalized in 1997 by ASIRI (Association of Indonesia Recording Industry), PAPPRI (Association of Indonesian Singers, Songwriters and Music Record Producers), and KCI (Copyright Office of Indonesia). Fatin received five awards from seven nominations.

!
|-
| rowspan= "4" | 2014
| rowspan= "2" | "Aku Memilih Setia"
| Best Pop Female Solo Artist
| 
| rowspan= "4" | 

|-
| Best of the Best Newcomer
| 
|-
| rowspan= "2" | For You
| Best Pop/Urban Album
| 
|-
| Best of the Best Album
| 
|-
| 2015
| "Demi Cintaku"
| Best Pop Female Solo Artist
| 
|
|-
| 2017
| "Ketika Tangan dan Kaki Berkata"
| Best Islamic Spiritual-Lyric Production Work
| 
|
|-
| 2019
| "Jingga"
| Best Pop Female Solo Artist
| 
|

Anugerah Planet Muzik
The Anugerah Planet Muzik (English translation: Planet Music Awards), was an annual awards given to most popular artists from Indonesia, Singapore, and Malaysia. Fatin received two awards from 3 nominations.

!
|-
| rowspan= "2" | 2014
| "Aku Memilih Setia"
| Best Newcomer Female Artist
| 
| rowspan= "2" | 
|-
| "Dia Dia Dia"
| APM Most Popular Song
| 
|-
| 2015
| Fatin Shidqia
| APM Most Popular Artist
| 
|
|-

Bintang RPTI Awards

!
|-
| 2013
| rowspan= "2" | Fatin Shidqia
| rowspan= "2" | Celebrity Top Rating of the Year
| 
| 
|-
| 2014
| 
| 
|-

Cinemags Reader's Choice Awards

!
|-
| 2014
| "Cahaya Di Langit Itu" (99 Cahaya di Langit Eropa)
| Favorite Soundtrack
| 
|
|-

Daf BAMA Music Awards
The Daf BAMA Music Awards are awards to honor artists who have spread their charms, breaking the boundary between the countries and also shall immortalize creativity among the global music lovers till the end of time. Fatin received one award from 5 nominations.

!
|-
| rowspan= "3" | 2016
| rowspan= "5" | Fatin Shidqia
| Best Asian New Female Act
| 
| rowspan= "3" | 

|-
| Best New Act
| 
|-
| rowspan= "2" | People's Choice Award
| 
|-
| rowspan= "2" | 2017
| 
| rowspan= "2" | 
|-
| Best Rising Act
| 
|-

Dahsyatnya Awards
The Dahsyatnya Awards are annual awards presented by the daily Indonesian TV show Dahsyat that airs on RCTI. Fatin received three awards from 6 nominations.

!
|-
| rowspan= "2" | 2014
| "Aku Memilih Setia"
| Outstanding Song
| 
| rowspan= "2" | 
|-
| rowspan= "2" | Fatin Shidqia
| Outstanding Newcomer
| 
|-
| rowspan= "3" | 2015
| Outstanding Female Solo Singer
| 
| rowspan= "3" | 
|-
| rowspan= "2" | "Kamulah Kamuku" (feat. The Overtunes)
| Outstanding Duet/Collaboration
| 
|-
| Outstanding Song
| 
|-
| rowspan= "1" | 2016
| Fatin Shidqia
| Outstanding Female Solo Singer
| 
| 
|-

Expose Awards

!
|-
| rowspan= "4" | 2013
| rowspan= "3" | Fatin Shidqia
| Celeb of the Year
| 
| 
|-
| Female Singer of the Year
| 
| 
|-
| Newcomer of the Year
| 
| 
|-
| "Aku Memilih Setia"
| Song of the Year
| 
| 
|-

Fokus Selebriti Awards

!
|-
| 2013
| Fatin Shidqia
| Focused Female Celebrity
| 
| 
|-

Global Seru Awards
The Global Seru Awards are awarded to celebrities who have caught the attention of the public through interesting or exciting accomplishments.

!
|-
| rowspan= "2" | 2014
| Fatin Shidqia
| Most Exciting Newcomer
| 
| rowspan= "2" | 
|-
| "Aku Memilih Setia"
| Most Exciting Song
| 
|-

Hai Reader's Poll Music Awards
Created by online magazine Hai, the Hai Reader's Poll Music Awards are an awards to honour talent in popular music. The awards have been used by online voting. Fatin received one award from 4 nominations.

!
|-
| rowspan= "2" | 2013
| rowspan= "4" | Fatin Shidqia
| The Best Freshmeat
| 
| rowspan= "2" |
|-
| rowspan= "3" | The Best Female
| 
|-
| 2014
| 
|
|-
| 2015
| 
|
|-

I-Cinema Awards

!
|-
| 2016
| Dreams
| Favorite Newcomer Role
| 
| 
|-

Inbox Awards
The Inbox Awards are awarded to recognize talent in music and entertainment. The awards were launched in 2008 and presented by Indonesian television show Inbox which aired on SCTV. Fatin received two awards from 9 nominations.

!
|-
| rowspan= "3" | 2014
| "Aku Memilih Setia"
| Most Inbox Song
| 
| rowspan= "3" | 
|-
| Fatinistic
| Most Inbox Fanbase
| 
|-
| rowspan= "3" | Fatin Shidqia
| rowspan= "2" | Most Inbox Female Solo Singer
| 
|-
| rowspan= "3" | 2015
| 
| rowspan= "3" |
|-
| Most Inbox Darling Social Media Artist
| 
|-
| rowspan= "2" | Fatinistic
| rowspan= "2" | Most Inbox Fanbase
| 
|-
| rowspan= "3" | 2016
| 
| rowspan= "3" |
|-
| Fatin Shidqia
| Most Inbox Female Solo Singer
| 
|-
| "Away"
| Most Inbox Song
| 
|-

Indonesian Social Media Awards
The Indonesian Social Media Awards were presented by SCTV for award to celebrities who had become a trending topic in each social media, such as Twitter, Facebook and Instagram.

!
|-
| 2016
| Fatin Shidqia
| Female Celeb Facebook
| 
|
|-

Indonesian Choice Awards
The Indonesian Choice Awards are awards given by the Indonesian television station NET. Fatin received one award from 2 nominations.

!
|-
| 2014
| rowspan= "2" |Fatin Shidqia
| Breakthrough Artist of the Year
| 
| 
|-
| 2016
| Female Singer of the Year
| 
|
|-

Infotainment Awards
The Infotainment Awards are an awards ceremony were presented by SCTV and established since 2012, to awarded for celebrity whom to be appreciated in entertainment.

!
|-
| 2015
| Fatin Shidqia
| Most Exist Celebrity Social Media
| 
|
|-

Mom & Kids Awards
First established in MNCTV on 2016, the Mom & Kids Awards are an awards were given as appreciate and inspiration for mother and kids. Fatin received one award.

!
|-
| 2015
| Fatin Shidqia
| Favorite Female Singer
| 
| 
|-

Nickelodeon Indonesia Kids' Choice Awards
The Nickelodeon Indonesia Kids' Choice Awards is the Indonesian version of Nickelodeon Kids' Choice Awards, held since 2008 in Jakarta. Fatin received two awards.

!
|-
| rowspan= "2" | 2014
| rowspan= "2" | Fatin Shidqia
| Favorite Solo Singer
| 
| rowspan= "2" | 
|-
| Slime Star
| 
|-

SCTV Awards
The SCTV Awards is an award given by the Indonesian television station SCTV, based on the audience's votes. Fatin received one award from 2 nominations.

!
|-
| 2014
| Fatin Shidqia
| Famous Singer
| 
|
|-
| 2015
| "Jangan Kau Bohong" (for High School Love Story)
| Famous Soap Opera Soundtrack
| 
| 
|-

SCTV Music Awards
The SCTV Music Awards is an annual awards for Indonesian musician and held by Indonesian television station, SCTV, since 2003. The event given some awards, who the winner selected based on voting public through SMS.

!
|-
| 2015
| rowspan= "2" |Fatin Shidqia
| rowspan= "2" |Most Famous Female Solo Singer
| 
|
|-
| rowspan= "2" |2016
|
| rowspan= "2" |
|-
| "Away"
| Most Famous Video Clip
| 
|-
| 2017
| rowspan= "2" | Fatin Shidqia
| rowspan= "2" | Most Famous Female Solo Singer
| 
|
|-
| 2018
| 
|

World Music Awards
The World Music Awards is an international awards show founded in 1989 under the patronage of Albert II, Prince of Monaco and based in Monte Carlo. Awards are presented to the world's best selling artist in various categories and to the best-selling artist from each major territory. Sales figures are provided by the International Federation of the Phonographic Industry. Fatin received one award from 4 nominations.

!
|-
| rowspan= "4" | 2014
| rowspan= "4" | Fatin Shidqia
| World's Best Female Artist
| 
| rowspan= "4" | 
|-
| World's Best Live Act
| 
|-
| World's Best Entertainer of the Year
| 
|-
| World's Best Indonesian Female Artist (Voted)
| 
|-

Yahoo! OMG Awards
The Yahoo! OMG Awards are presented annually since 2012 by Yahoo! Indonesia for celebrities in music, film and news. Based on voted by fans in Yahoo! websites. Fatin received one award.

!
|-
| 2013
| Fatin Shidqia
| Rising Star of the Year
| 
| 
|-

References

Shidqia, Fatin